James Thomas Harrison (November 30, 1811 – May 22, 1879) was an American politician who served as a Deputy from Mississippi to the Provisional Congress of the Confederate States from 1861 to 1862.

Biography
James Thomas Harrison was born in Pendleton, South Carolina. He later moved to Columbus, Mississippi. He was a descendant of Virginia Governor and United States Declaration of Independence signatory Benjamin Harrison V (1726–1791). His daughter, Regina, married Lieutenant-General Stephen D. Lee in 1865.

References

External links
 
 James Thomas Harrison at The Political Graveyard

1811 births
1879 deaths
19th-century American lawyers
19th-century American politicians
Burials in Mississippi
Deputies and delegates to the Provisional Congress of the Confederate States
Mississippi lawyers
Members of the Confederate House of Representatives from Mississippi
People from Pendleton, South Carolina
People of Mississippi in the American Civil War
Signers of the Confederate States Constitution
Signers of the Provisional Constitution of the Confederate States